Nogometni Klub GOŠK Gabela is a professional association football club based in Gabela, near Čapljina, Bosnia and Herzegovina. The name GOŠK in Bosnian means Gabeoski Omladinski Športski Klub (Gabela Youth Sports Club).

In the season 2010–11, GOŠK won 1st place in the First League of FBiH and got promoted to the Premier League of Bosnia and Herzegovina, the elite football league in Bosnia and Herzegovina. They managed to repeat that achievement in the 2016–17 season and played in the Bosnian Premier League until the 2018–19 season when the club finished last on 12th place and got relegated back to the First League of FBiH.

Their home ground is the Stadium Perica-Pero Pavlović (until recently called "Podavala" – old name Erar) in Gabela which can hold about 3,000 people. GNK Dinamo Zagreb donated 5,000 chairs to club.

Their supporters are known as the Blue Lions (Plavi Lavovi). They were founded in 2001.

History
The first ball in Gabela was brought by Andrija Korda and Vidan Krvavac in 1919, from Mostar.

1941–45 the club was dissolved because of World War II. In 1948 the club was formed again.
The club was named GOŠK after the recommendations of Milorad Mandrapa in 1958. Under the name GOŠK, the club achieved gradual improvement in competitive results. Gabela ranked among the most popular sports village in the former Yugoslavia.
In the Socialist Federal Republic of Yugoslavia, GOŠK mostly played in the Fourth Unfederal League (Mostar zone) in the seasons (1948–60, 1962–63, 1964–66, 1968–92) and three times in the Third League (1961–62, 1963–64, 1966–67).

In the 1990s, the club played in the First League of Herzeg-Bosnia, between 2001 and 2003 in the Second League of FBiH, between 2003 and 2011 in the First League of FBiH, 2011–13 Premier League of Bosnia and Herzegovina, 2013–17 First League of FBiH, 2017–19 Bosnian Premier League and currently, since 2019, the First League of FBiH.

Former names
 1919–1926 – FK Zmaj
 1926–1935 – FK Seljačka Sloga
 1935–1941 – Seljački športski klub (ŠSK)
 1948–1949 – NK Zmaj
 1949–1958 – NK Sloga
 1958–present – GOŠK Gabela

Honours

Domestic

League
First League of the Federation of Bosnia and Herzegovina:
Winners (2): 2010–11, 2016–17
Runners-up (3): 2007–08, 2014–15, 2021–22
Second League of the Federation of Bosnia and Herzegovina:
Winners (1): 2002–03

Players

Current squad

Players with multiple nationalities
  Pero Džidić
  Toni Tipurić
  Ivan Peko
  Josip Šantić
  Luka Nižić
  Dražan Glibo

Places in Leagues and Cups
In Socialist Federal Republic of Yugoslavia:

In Bosnia and Herzegovina:

Young categories
Cadets and juniors play in the Youth Premier League. Pioneers and prior to pioneers play in the Youth Leagues of the Herzegovina-Neretva Canton.

Andrija Anković Memorial Tournament
Every year since 1986, in Gabela, GOŠK host a memorial tournament in the name of Andrija Anković in which teams such as GNK Dinamo Zagreb, HNK Hajduk Split, NK Široki Brijeg and HŠK Zrinjski Mostar usually play in.

Managerial history
 Ivan Katalinić (1 July 2007 – 30 June 2008)
 Darko Dražić (15 June 2011 – 5 September 2011)
 Milomir Odović (8 September 2011 – 27 January 2012)
 Boris Gavran (30 January 2012 – 24 June 2012)
 Slaven Musa (27 June 2012 – 13 August 2012)
 Dario Zadro (13 August 2012 – 12 October 2012)
 Ivan Katalinić (5 September 2012 – 10 January 2013)
 Davor Mladina (10 January 2013 – 20 June 2013)
 Tomislav Raguž (1 July 2013 – 13 September 2013)
 Faruk Kulović (16 September 2013 – 30 June 2014)
 Darko Vojvodić (17 October 2014 – 30 June 2015)
 Faruk Kulović (1 July 2015 – 12 October 2015)
 Tomislav Raguž (19 January 2016 – 30 June 2016)
 Nedim Jusufbegović (1 July 2016 – 18 September 2016)
 Zlatko Križanović (caretaker) (23 September 2016 – 6 December 2016)
 Darko Vojvodić (7 January 2017 – 6 June 2017)
 Slaven Musa (12 June 2017 – 26 November 2017)
 Feđa Dudić (27 November 2017 – 28 September 2018)
 Mato Neretljak (28 September 2018 – 12 March 2019)
 Stanko Mršić (12 March 2019 – 1 June 2019)
 Nenad Gagro (25 June 2019 – 28 October 2019)
 Vule Trivunović (28 October 2019 – 22 August 2020)
 Igor Pamić (27 August 2020 – 26 October 2020)
 Ivan Bubalo (5 January 2021 – 27 March 2022)
 Dženan Hošić (28 March 2022 – 3 May 2022)
 Denis Ćorić (4 May 2022 – present)

References

External links
NK GOŠK Gabela at Soccerway 

 
Association football clubs established in 1919
Football clubs in Bosnia and Herzegovina
Croatian football clubs in Bosnia and Herzegovina
Čapljina
1919 establishments in Bosnia and Herzegovina